"Mississippi" Joe Callicott (October 10, 1899 – May 1969) was an American Delta blues singer and guitarist.

Callicott was born in Nesbit, Mississippi, United States. In 1929 he played second guitar in Garfield Akers' duet recording, "Cottonfield Blues", and in 1930 he recorded "Fare Thee Well Blues" and "Traveling Mama Blues" for the Brunswick label. His "Love Me Baby Blues" has been covered by various artists, for example by Ry Cooder under the title "France Chance". Some of his 1967 recordings (recorded by the music historian, George Mitchell) were released on LP by Arhoolie Records in 1969, and some were re-released in 2003, on the Fat Possum record label.

He served as a mentor to the guitarist Kenny Brown when Brown was ten years old.

Joe Callicott is buried in the Mount Olive Baptist Church Cemetery in Nesbit, Mississippi. On April 29, 1995, a memorial headstone was placed on his grave arranged by the Mt. Zion Memorial Fund with the help of Kenny Brown and financed by Chris Strachwitz, Arhoolie Records and John Fogerty. Callicott's original marker, a simple paving stone which read simply "JOE", was subsequently donated by his family to the Delta Blues Museum in Clarksdale, Mississippi. At the ceremony the Mount Zion Fund presented Callicott's wife Doll with a check from Arhoolie Records for royalties earned from a CD reissue of Callicott's work.

Discography

Studio albums
 Presenting the Country Blues (Blue Horizon, 1969)
 Mississippi Delta Blues Vol. 2 (Arhoolie, 1969 - side 2 only, side 1 by R. L. Burnside and Rosa Lee Hill)
 Deal Gone Down (Revival, 1970)

Compilation albums
 Ain't A Gonna Lie to You (Fat Possum, 2003)
 North Mississippi Blues (Southland, 2004)

References

External links
 Illustrated Mississippi Joe Callicott discography

1899 births
1969 deaths
People from Nesbit, Mississippi
African-American songwriters
American blues guitarists
American male guitarists
American blues singers
Fat Possum Records artists
Blues musicians from Mississippi
20th-century American guitarists
Songwriters from Mississippi
Guitarists from Mississippi
African-American guitarists
20th-century African-American male singers
American male songwriters